Scopula contramutata is a moth of the family Geometridae. It is endemic to Russia.

Taxonomy
The species was formerly listed as a subspecies of Scopula immutata, Scopula immutata contramutata.

References

Moths described in 1920
Moths of Asia
contramutata
Taxa named by Louis Beethoven Prout